In mathematics, the Brauer–Suzuki–Wall theorem, proved by , characterizes the one-dimensional unimodular projective groups over finite fields.

References

Theorems about finite groups